Luis J. Duggan (born March 6, 1906 – June 12, 1987) was an Argentine polo player who competed in the 1936 Summer Olympics.

He was part of the Argentine polo team, which won the gold medal. He played both matches in the tournament, the first against Mexico and the final against Great Britain.

External links
profile

1906 births
1987 deaths
Argentine people of British descent
Argentine polo players
Olympic polo players of Argentina
Polo players at the 1936 Summer Olympics
Olympic gold medalists for Argentina
Medalists at the 1936 Summer Olympics
Olympic medalists in polo